The 2002 Meistriliiga was the 12th season of the Meistriliiga, Estonia's premier football league. Flora won their sixth title.

League table

Relegation play-off

Kuressaare won 2–1 on aggregate and were promoted for the 2003 Meistriliiga. Lootus were relegated to the 2003 Esiliiga.

Results
Each team played every opponent four times, twice at home and twice on the road, for a total of 36 games.

First half of season

Second half of season

Top scorers

See also
 2001–02 Estonian Cup
 2002–03 Estonian Cup
 2002 Esiliiga

References

External links
 

 

Meistriliiga seasons
1
Estonia
Estonia